CHIREC International School is a K–12 school located in Hyderabad, India. The school was founded in 1989 by Mrs. Ratna D. Reddy. There are three campuses. The main campus is located in Kondapur, pre-primary campus in Jubilee Hills and a third in Gachibowli with pre-primary – Classes 1 to 3. The school offers three curricula: International Baccalaureate Diploma Programme (IBDP), Cambridge Assessment International Education (CAIE) and Central Board of Secondary Education (CBSE).

History
 
In April 1989, CHIREC began as a summer camp that offered training in fine arts, performing arts, computers, indoor and outdoor sports. In June, CHIREC evolved into a school for Nursery, PP-I & PP-II students. As the number of students wishing to attend CHIREC increased beyond the capacity of its 1993 Begumpet and Jubilee Hills campuses, in 1996, the then Chief Minister of Andhra Pradesh N. Chandrababu Naidu inaugurated CHIREC's eco-friendly 6-acre Integrated Campus at Kondapur. 

CHIREC unveiled its new Jubilee Hills pre-primary school campus, and introduced Senior Secondary classes at the Kondapur campus, in 2004. Shortly after, in 2006, the first batch of Class XII graduated from the school. The Gachibowli branch, which caters to students from Grades 1 through 3, was inaugurated in 2012.

Academics
CHIREC offers different international and local curricula across the different grade levels.

CHIREC's Day Care program is offered from 8 AM to 6:30 PM every weekday, for students aged 2 to 10.

Pre-primary
CHIREC's Early Years Pre-Primary program includes Topics of the Week, Show and Tell, Clay Modelling and Pottery, Painting, Arts and Crafts, Music, and Storytelling. Students’ cognitive, language, social skills are assessed informally on a weekly and monthly basis.

CBSE
CHIREC is affiliated to and accredited by the Central Board of Secondary Education (CBSE). CHIREC CBSE is offered for Classes 1–12.

CAIE
CHIREC is a CAIE school affiliated with the University of Cambridge. CHIREC's Cambridge Curriculum develops Mathematics, English, Science and ICT skills students from Grades 6–10.

IB
CHIREC IB is offered for Classes 11 and 12. Students study six course subjects at higher level [HL] or standard level [SL]. Students must choose subjects from Languages, Humanities, Sciences, Mathematics, and Arts.

Awards and recognitions
CHIREC International has consistently received recognition from the world's leading education magazines. Ranked among the top International Day Schools in the country by Education World Magazine since 2014, and Digital Learning Magazine 
CHIREC has also been routinely accorded with the "Academic Excellence Award" by Brainfeed Magazine, and the "International School Award" by the British Council.

In recent years, CHIREC has been granted the "ASIAONE Award" for being the "Best Brand in Education," and the NDTV Award for "Excellence in Sports."

CHIREC received the GLOBE Platinum Award for the ‘Best Brand’ at the World Business Conclave – Hong Kong in 2016.

Campuses 
CHIREC International has 3 campuses, in Kondapur (main campus), Jubilee Hills, and Gachibowli. Each of the three campuses is accessible to meet the needs of individuals with physical disabilities. These accessibility features include: Elevators, School wheelchairs, and Accessibility ramps.

Facilities
The school provides the following facilities (Note that not all facilities are available at each campus):

 Smart classrooms
 Conveyance
 Open air auditorium
 Multipurpose Hall
 Cricket pitch
 Basketball courts
 Volleyball courts
 Archery arena
 Skating Rink
 Table tennis rooms
 Art & craft room
 Science labs
 Fashion technology lab
 Home science lab
 Language labs
 Information technology labs
 Outdoor play area
 Doll house
 Sand & water play
 Music & hands-on activities
 Puppetry
 Car play with traffic signals
 Dining halls
 Pottery rooms
 First aid rooms
 Junior & senior libraries

Green Initiatives 
CHIREC International's Green Initiatives include:

 Solar Powered Campus
 Community Initiatives
 Recycling and Resource Management
 Awareness through Education

References

High schools and secondary schools in Hyderabad, India
1989 establishments in Andhra Pradesh
Educational institutions established in 1989
International schools in Hyderabad, India
Schools in Telangana
International schools in India